"Gotta Lotta That" is a song written by Bernice Bedwell in 1958 and published by Song Productions, BMI. It was first recorded by Gene Summers and His Rebels in 1958 and issued by Jan/Jane Records. The "Gotta Lotta That" recording session took place at the Liberty Records Studios in Hollywood, California and featured Rene Hall and James McClung on guitar, Plas Johnson on saxophone, Earl Palmer on drums, and George "Red" Callendar on bass. The flipside of "Gotta Lotta That" was "Nervous".

Reviews
Billboard - June 1958 - 'Reviews of New Pop Records' by Gene Summers - "Gotta Lotta That" - "A swinging, blues effort that really moves and rocks. Good sound and solid performance by Summers with fine guitar support".

"Gotta Lotta That" cover versions
Johnny Devlin - New Zealand
Andy Lee & Tennessee Rain - Germany
Rudy Lacrioux & The All-Stars - UK

References
Gene Summers discography from Rocky Productions, France
Gene Summers discography from Wangdangdula Finland
Gene Summers session data from Tapio's Fin-A-Billy, Finland

Sources
Billboard Magazine- June 1958 Reviews of New Pop Records United States
Liner notes "The Ultimate School Of Rock & Roll" 1997 United States
Johnny Devlin, "How Would Ya Be" LP, Prestige Records PLP 1201 New Zealand, 1958
Andy Lee & Tennessee Rain, "I Don't Wanna Be Lonely Tonight" CD, Grunwald Records Germany, 2004
Rudy LaCrioux & The All-Stars, "Let's Have A Ball" CD, Spendrift Records CD 107 UK 2001
"Cover Versions Of The Songs Made Famous By Gene Summers" 2007  United States
Article and sessionography in issue 15 (1977) of New Kommotion Magazine UK
Article and sessionography in issue 23 (1980) of New Kommotion Magazine UK
Feature article and sessionography in issue 74 (1999) of Rockin' Fifties Magazine Germany
Feature article with photo spread in issue 53 (2000) of Bill Griggs' Rockin' 50s Magazine United States
Feature Article with photo spread in issue 54 (2000) of Bill Griggs' Rockin' 50s Magazine United States

See also
Rockin' Country Style

1958 singles
Gene Summers songs
1958 songs
Jubilee Records singles